Matthew Collins may refer to:
Matthew Collins (Welsh footballer) (born 1986), Welsh footballer for Hungerford Town
Matthew Collins (Australian footballer) (born 1977), Australian rules footballer
Matthew Collins (academic), Professor of biomolecular archaeology
Matthew Collins (rower) (born 1967), American lightweight rower
Matthew Collins (barrister) (born 1970), Australian barrister
Matthew F. Collins (born 1972), British activist
Matthew Collins, a fictional character in the 1953 film The War of the Worlds

See also
Matthew Collings (born 1955), British art critic and broadcaster
 Collins (surname)